This article is a discography for American singing group The Ronettes. The Ronettes began recording with Colpix Records in 1961 and recorded eleven songs for Colpix. In March 1963, the group moved to Phil Spector's Philles Records, where they achieved their biggest success.

Albums

Studio albums

Compilation albums

Singles

Other charted and certified songs

Unreleased music
Songs Produced by Phil Spector

The Ronettes recorded many songs for producer Phil Spector that were not released until after the group disbanded in 1967. Today, some of their originally unreleased songs are just as critically applauded as their biggest hits. Below is an accurate chart of the unreleased songs the Ronettes recorded for Philles Records that did not see a release. These songs were first issued on later compilation albums, mentioned respectively. Four of the songs below—"The Twist", "Mashed Potato Time", "Hot Pastrami" and "The Wah-Watusi"—were released, and credited to, popular Philles contracted singing group The Crystals, on their 1963 Philles LP, The Crystals Sing The Greatest Hits.

Work with Jimi Hendrix
During the Summer of 1964, the Ronettes spent a lot of time hanging out at Odine's, an exclusive East Side club on Fifty-Ninth Street in Manhattan. According to Ronnie, that is where the Ronettes were first introduced to Jimi Hendrix, who was an unknown guitarist there at the time. Ronnie used to get up and sing along with Hendrix as he played guitar. After running into Hendrix again at a party in 1969, Estelle and Ronnie were invited into the studio to do backing vocals on Hendrix's "Earth Blues" song. Their work on the backing vocals earned The Ronettes a credit on Hendrix's posthumously released LP Rainbow Bridge, released in October 1971.

References

Discographies of American artists
Pop music discographies
Rhythm and blues discographies